The Africa Zone was the unique zone within Group 3 of the regional Davis Cup competition in 2019. The zone's competition was held in round robin format in Nairobi, Kenya, from 11 to 14 September 2019.

Participating nations

Draw
Date: 11–14 September

Location: Nairobi Club Ground, Nairobi, Kenya (clay)

Format: Round-robin basis.

Seeding

 1Davis Cup Rankings as of 4 February 2019

Round Robin

Pool A

Pool B

Standings are determined by: 1. number of wins; 2. number of matches; 3. in two-team ties, head-to-head records; 4. in three-team ties, (a) percentage of sets won (head-to-head records if two teams remain tied), then (b) percentage of games won (head-to-head records if two teams remain tied), then (c) Davis Cup rankings.

Playoffs
The winners of the 1st vs 2nd playoffs are promoted to Group II, the losers of the 3rd vs 4th playoff are relegated in group IV

Round Robin

Pool A

Tunisia vs. Mozambique

Namibia vs. Nigeria

Tunisia vs. Nigeria

Namibia vs. Mozambique

Tunisia vs. Namibia

Nigeria vs. Mozambique

Pool B

Kenya vs. Madagascar

Benin vs. Algeria

Kenya vs. Algeria

Benin vs. Madagascar

Kenya vs. Benin

Algeria vs. Madagascar

Playoffs

1st to 2nd playoff

Madagascar vs. Tunisia

3rd to 4th playoff

Mozambique vs. Kenya

5th to 6th playoff

Algeria vs. Nigeria

7th to 8th playoff

Namibia vs. Benin

References

External links
Official Website

Africa Zone Group III
Davis Cup Europe/Africa Zone